Jacob Canady (born December 10, 1998), known professionally as ATL Jacob, is an American record producer. He is known for his dark and mellow production style and his frequent collaborations with American rapper Future being a former in-house producer for the latter's record label Freebandz.

Born and raised in Atlanta, Canady began his music career at age 14. In 2022, he was nominated as Producer of the Year for the 2022 BET Hip Hop Awards. The same year, he received two Grammy nominations for his work as a co-producer on Future and Drake's song Wait For U featuring Tems and in 2023, won the Grammy Award for Best Melodic Rap Performance during the 65th Annual Grammy Awards.

Early life 
Jacob Canady was born on December 10, 1998, in Atlanta, Georgia.

Career
Canady initially gained interest in record production as a teenager after wanting to rap on his own instrumentals. In 2017, he recalls working as an audio engineer in a studio and being frustrated by artists' attitudes toward engineers. In January 2023, he was voted as the Producer of the Year for the XXL Awards 2023.

Notes

References 

1998 births
Living people
African-American record producers
American hip hop record producers
Republic Records artists
Musicians from Atlanta
Southern hip hop musicians
Trap musicians